Haskell Township may refer to:
Haskell Township, Saline County, Arkansas
Haskell Township, Haskell County, Kansas
Haskell Township, Coal County, Oklahoma, an Oklahoma township
Haskell Township, Tillman County, Oklahoma, an  Oklahoma township

See also
 Haskell (disambiguation)